The 1985 European Amateur Team Championship took place from 26 to 30 June at Halmstad Golf Club, in Tylösand, Sweden. It was the 14th men's golf European Amateur Team Championship.

Venue 

The tournament was played at the club's North course. The club was founded in 1930. Its first 18-hole course, located in Tylösand, Halmstad Municipality, 9 kilometers west of Halmstad city center in Halland County, Sweden, was constructed by Rafael Sundblom and approved in 1938. A new course was inaugurated in 1967. Together with the last nine holes of the old course, this formed the new course, called the North Course.

Format 
Each team consisted of six players, playing two rounds of an opening stroke-play qualifying competition over two days, counting the five best scores each day for each team.

The eight best teams formed flight A, in knock-out match-play over the next three days. The teams were seeded based on their positions after the stroke play. The first placed team were drawn to play the quarter final against the eight placed team, the second against the seventh, the third against the sixth and the fourth against the fifth. Teams were allowed to use six players during the team matches, selecting four of them in the two morning foursome games and five players in to the afternoon single games. Games all square at the 18th hole were declared halved, if the team match was already decided.

The seven teams placed 9–15 in the qualification stroke-play formed flight B and the four teams placed 16–19 formed flight C, to play similar knock-out play to decide their final positions.

Teams 
19 nation teams contested the event. Each team consisted of five or six players.

Players in the leading teams

Other participating teams

Winners 
Host country Sweden won the opening 36-hole competition, with a score of 14 over par 734.

Individual leaders were Jesper Parnevik, Sweden and Erkki Välimää, Finland, each of them with a score of 2-under-par 142, two strokes ahead of Peter McEvoy, England.

Team Scotland won the gold medal, earning their third title, beating Sweden in the final 4.5–2.5. Team Spain earned the bronze on third place, after beating England 4.5–2.5 in the bronze match.

José María Olazábal, Spain, made a hole-in-one on the 13th hole, during his 3 and 2 single match win over Colin Montgomerie in the semi final between Spain and Scotland.

Results 
Qualification round

Team standings

* Note: In the event of a tie the order was determined by the best total of the two non-counting scores of the two rounds.

Individual leaders

 Note: There was no official award for the lowest individual scores.

Flight A

Bracket

Final games

* Note: Game declared halved, since team match already decided.

Flight B

Bracket

Flight C

Bracket

Final standings

Sources:

See also 
 Eisenhower Trophy – biennial world amateur team golf championship for men organized by the International Golf Federation.
 European Ladies' Team Championship – European amateur team golf championship for women organised by the European Golf Association.

References

External links 
 European Golf Association: Full results

European Amateur Team Championship
Golf tournaments in Sweden
European Amateur Team Championship
European Amateur Team Championship
European Amateur Team Championship